Ethel Cuff Black (October 17, 1890 – September 17, 1977) was one of the founders of Delta Sigma Theta Sorority, Incorporated. She was elected the sorority's first vice president and attended the Deltas’ first public event, the Woman Suffrage Procession in Washington, D.C., in March 1913. Prominent suffragist Mary Church Terrell lobbied on behalf of the Deltas to win them a place in the parade, where they were the only African-American organization represented.

Biography

Ethel L. Cuff was born in Wilmington, Delaware. Her father, Richard Cuff, was a tanner in an African-American owned business. Her maternal grandfather was a Civil War veteran. In Bordentown, New Jersey, she attended the Industrial School for Colored Youth and graduated with the highest grade point average. At Howard University, she was chairwoman of the collegiate chapter of the YWCA. During college, she was also the vice-president of Alpha Kappa Alpha, but later voted to reorganize the sorority and formed Delta Sigma Theta with twenty-one other women Due to illness, she graduated Howard in 1915.  She was also the first African-American teacher in Rochester, New York. She was married in 1939 to real estate agent David Horton Black.

References

External links

Delta Sigma Theta Founder History at the University of Texas
"Black Greek-letter organizations in the twenty-first century", Parks, Gregory, 2008

1890 births
1977 deaths
African-American schoolteachers
Bordentown School alumni
Schoolteachers from Delaware
American women educators
Delta Sigma Theta founders
Howard University alumni
People from Wilmington, Delaware
20th-century African-American women
20th-century African-American people
20th-century American people